Spartan: Total Warrior is a 2005 hack and slash video game developed by Creative Assembly and published by Sega for PlayStation 2, Xbox and GameCube. Released in Europe and North America in October, it is a spin-off of the Total War series.
 
The plot revolves around a Spartan warrior, secretly guided by the god Ares, as he fights alongside his Greek allies against the invading Roman Empire. While the Total War series traditionally focuses upon real historical scenarios, the plot of Spartan: Total Warrior is fictional, involving figures from both Greek and Roman mythology, and featuring anachronistic elements. It is also the only installment in the series to have been released for video game consoles rather than PCs or Macs. It was the first Total War game published by Sega, who had purchased Creative Assembly earlier in 2005.
 
Spartan received a mixed reception. Although some reviewers found the game to be a glorified button-masher, and criticized the combat as repetitive, others praised the game engine and the scope of the battles.

Gameplay
Spartan Total Warrior is a hack and slash game wherein the player is able to use two main types of attack; a simple attack which damages one enemy, and a radial attack which damages multiple enemies. The simple attack is fast and causes more damage; the radial attack is slower, but damages multiple enemies moderately. One button is used to initiate the single attack, and a different button to initiate the radial attack. However, each attack can be modified in certain ways; for example, rather than using the character's weapon, the player can initiate either an individual or a radial attack using their shield, their bow or their magic power.
 

As the player progresses through the game, new weapons are unlocked, each of which comes with its specific advantages. The player begins with a sword and shield, and a basic bow. The first new weapon is the Blades of Athena, dual swords which are considerably faster than the single sword. Later in the game, the shield is upgraded to the Shield of Medusa, and bow to the Bow of Power. The player can also unlock completely new weaponry; a war hammer named Death-Biter, and a spear named the Spear of Achilles. The Death Biter is very strong, but slow, whilst the Spear has a long reach and deals moderate damage, but combos are difficult to execute. The player character also grows in strength as the game progresses. At the end of each level, he is awarded tokens which he can use to increase his damage, health and magic.
 
Magic in the game is in the form of "Power of the Gods." When the player's magic tank is full, the player can use single or radial magic attacks, with each weapon having a specific magical power linked to its single and radial attack. For example, the Shield of Medusa radial magic attack turns all on-screen enemies to stone for a short period of time, whilst the Blades of Athena individual magic attack causes a single enemy to explode. Another important feature of the game is when the character lands a certain number of attacks, a rage meter fills, which, when full, can be used to unleash powerful attacks. Again, each weapon has its own specific rage attack, and the player has a choice between an individual rage attack or a radial rage attack. The player also has a bow and arrow, which can fire single arrows or multiple arrows. The bow can be combined with both the Power of the Gods and the rage ability to produce powerful individual and radial attacks.
 
Combat tends to focus on large battles with multiple combatants. The player will often take on large numbers of enemies at once, sometimes with AI allies, sometimes alone. In the midst of battle, a small flash is placed on an attacking enemy's weapon to indicate the danger of an impending strike. Care must be taken to block incoming attacks in between offensive blows, hence the player must balance offence and defense to avoid taking damage. The player's shield can also be used to shove enemies back (again, the player has the option to shove back a single enemy a good distance, or perform a radial shove, pushing a group of enemies back a small distance). This allows the player to interrupt an enemy's block, or to shove enemies off ledges. Shield attacks are especially important for fighting enemies who themselves have shields, as shield attacks can knock them off balance briefly, leaving them open to attack. When an enemy has been knocked to the ground, the player can perform a one hit finishing move, which differs with each weapon. Using these finishing moves in succession fills the rage bar much quicker than landing successful attacks on standing enemies.

Story
It is 300 BC, and the Roman army is in the midst of conquering Greece. Overseen by Emperor Tiberius (voiced by Kevin Howarth) from Rome, the army has subdued most of the country, with only Sparta remaining. The Spartan king, Leonidas (Bill Roberts), is preparing his troops for imminent invasion. Under his command is a man known simply as "The Spartan", (Qaurie Marshall) an orphan raised from childhood to be a soldier, who has developed exceptional skills. His closest friends are the brothers Castor and Pollux (Tom Clarke Hill and Noah Lee Margetts, respectively). As Leonidas rallies his troops, The Spartan hears the voice of Ares, God of War (Stanley Townsend), who offers him a deal; he will aid The Spartan in defeating the Romans and reveal his true identity in return for The Spartan delivering an unspecified revenge.
 
Led by General Crassus (Jay Simon), the Romans attack the city with Talos, a bronze giant. However, The Spartan is able to destroy Talos with catapults. That night, Ares instructs him to infiltrate the Roman camp and recover the Blades of Athena, lost since the Trojan War. Accompanied by Castor, The Spartan is successful, and during the raid, they encounter Electra (Julia Innocenti), Queen of the Amazons, who was captured whilst tracking the Romans through Greece. Imprisoned in the camp, she had killed her guards and was escaping when she met Castor and The Spartan, who now has the Blades of Athena. Once back in Sparta, she demands to speak to Leonidas, telling him the Romans have built an incredibly powerful weapon, capable of obliterating the entire city. She is proven correct when Crassus reveals a weapon powered by an imprisoned Medusa, with the capability of turning entire phalanxes to stone in a split second. The Spartan fights his way to Medusa, and destroys the weapon, also killing Crassus and taking his sword and magical shield.
 
Ares then instructs The Spartan to go to the ruins of Troy and recover the Spear of Achilles. The Spartan travels through the Badlands north of Sparta with Castor, Pollux and Electra, saving a village from barbarian warriors under the command of Beowulf (Seamus O'Neil), whom The Spartan kills and claims his warhammer Deathbiter. Upon their arrival in Troy, The Spartan enters the ruins under the city, where he encounters Sejanus (Jason Isaacs), the Praetorian prefect who serves as Tiberius' right-hand man. Sejanus is also a powerful necromancer, capable of resurrecting the dead. The Spartan fights his way through the ruins of the city, and upon reaching the tomb of Achilles, he is once again confronted by Sejanus, who makes him fight a copy of himself, with the same abilities and knowledge. The Spartan again survives, and retrieves the Spear. However, before he and his allies can leave the city, Sejanus tells them Sparta has fallen. The Spartan is then attacked by the Hydra. Using the Spear, he is able to defeat it.
 
The group travel to Athens, seeking the advice of the scientist Archimedes (Jay Benedict), who is leading the Athenian Resistance. The Spartan protects Archimedes from Roman assassins, saves several resistance members from execution, and leads the people of Athens in a revolution, storming the mansion occupied by Sejanus and the Praetorian Guard, although Sejanus escapes. The Spartan then re-activates one of Archimedes' inventions, the Eye of Apollo, to power a lightning gun, which he uses to shoot down the dragon Ladon, resurrected by Sejanus as a flying steed. Once dismounted, Pollux attacks Sejanus, but is swiftly killed. Sejanus then turns him into a zombie whom Castor is forced to fight, whilst The Spartan and Electra battle Sejanus. They seemingly kill Sejanus and mourn Pollux, but celebrate as the Romans are driven from Athens.
 
Leaving Electra in Athens to oversee Pollux's funeral, The Spartan and Castor travel to Rome, via the Gates of Saturn, a heavily guarded fortress in the Alps. In the complex, they encounter an undead Sejanus, who has returned from Hades. The Spartan kills Sejanus' priestesses, who were the source of his power, before killing Sejanus for good. The Spartan and Castor then continue to Rome and meet up with Electra, where they plan to assassinate Tiberius. The Spartan enters the Roman sewers and catacombs to infiltrate the city, while the others travel to the Colosseum, where Tiberius is attending a gladiatorial contest. They plan to kill Tiberius by placing explosives under his platform. After encountering and defeating the Minotaur in the sewers beneath Rome, The Spartan reaches the surface. However, the others are discovered and forced to detonate the bomb too early, missing Tiberius. The Spartan saves Electra and Castor from execution, and makes his way to Tiberius. However, Tiberius commits suicide out of fear of an unknown "master."
 
The Spartan enters the arena, where he meets Ares, who tells him he is the son of one of Aphrodite's handmaidens. The handmaiden had revealed Ares' affair with Aphrodite to her husband, Hephaestus. Ares killed the handmaiden, but was banished by the other gods. Knowing Ares would want to kill the handmaiden's son out of spite, the gods decided to hide him among the humans. He was thus left in Sparta as a baby and granted superhuman powers so as to protect himself should Ares ever locate him. Unable to find the child, Ares manipulated Tiberius and orchestrated the Roman invasion of Greece, knowing the war would bring the child to the fore because of his abilities. The death of The Spartan is the revenge which Ares seeks. Ares and The Spartan fight, with The Spartan killing the god. Castor and Electra then arrive, and Castor, now King of Sparta, states; "It was over. Our epic quest to stop Tiberius and the Roman Empire had ultimately drawn us to this moment. The Spartan had discovered his true identity, defeated the Empire, and battled a vengeful god to free his people. A warrior, a hero, a legend."

Development

Origins and technology

 
Spartan: Total Warrior grew out of Creative Assembly's desire to do a Total War game on a console. However, the team quickly discovered that because of technical limitations, it was impossible to do a "true" Total War game on a console. In a 2012 interview with Eurogamer, Creative Assembly director Mike Simpson explained "we couldn't fit a Total War battlefield, with 10,000 guys, into any of the consoles. It just doesn't work. You can't fit a gallon into a pint pot, it doesn't go. That's clearly been the main constraint." As such, the developers decided instead to do an action game in the tradition of the series; rather than the mass battlefields and real-time tactics gameplay in which the player controls a commanding officer overseeing the army, in Spartan, the player would control a soldier within a smaller battle.
 
As soon as the development team behind Rugby completed that project, they began work on Spartan. The first task was to create a demo. Designed by project lead Clive Gratton, the demo was created solely in order to determine whether it was possible for a console to handle hundreds of independently acting characters on-screen at once. The demo, which took six months to code, consisted of 300 Roman soldiers running over a hill with a castle in the background and the player character in the middle of the group. The demo ran at 60fps and had a draw distance of 750 meters, which was much deeper than Gratton had anticipated.
 
Once they had determined consoles could handle the game, the team began to work on the concept. They wanted to use aspects of the Roman Empire they had encountered in their research for Rome: Total War, but hadn't used in the actual game. They then began to speculate as to who would be a good theoretical opponent for the Romans. Gratton was a fan of the mythology that has built up concerning the Battle of Thermopylae, and decided that the Spartans would be the perfect protagonists. This also led the team into the realm of creating an ahistorical narrative, because "Thermopylae is a historical story which has almost crossed over into myth. Yes, there was an outnumbered battle there which helped save Greece from the Persians, but the details have been lost." However, creating an ahistorical story was not something the team did lightly. Gratton explains;
 

 
As well as the work of Ray Harryhausen (particularly Jason and the Argonauts), the team also took inspiration from Braveheart and Gladiator.
 
The technology behind the game relied heavily upon the use of a vector processor in the PlayStation 2 called Vector-unit Zero (VU0). According to Gratton, "a large chunk of this game is written in hand coded assembly language on the vector units. It's a miracle of technology!" He also explained that because the CPUs of both the Xbox and GameCube are so adept, although the game was developed on PlayStation 2 technology, it transferred straight across to the other consoles. Gratton was also keen to point out that no middleware was used at any point during the production of the game, and that the technological innovations were all based upon gameplay decisions; not simply to be innovative for innovation's sake.

Gameplay
Although the game is played on a large scale, the designers were also concerned to make individual combat important. According to Gratton,
 

 
Gratton wanted the player to have multiple options at every point of the game;
 

 
However, Gratton was determined to avoid the game becoming a button-masher, where the player could easily win by continually attacking. He also wanted to avoid the use of complex multi-button combos; "creating a UI which was simple and yet allowed access to a large variety of clearly differentiated moves was a priority." This is where the idea of radial combat came from; the attack button performs different actions depending on which shoulder button is pressed, thus allowing the player to change their strategy instantaneously in battle, whether using the sword, shield or bow. Gratton says the depth of the combat is based on "finger memory," with the combat system's simplicity being its strongest feature;

Announcement and promotion
The game was officially announced at the Game Developers Conference on March 8, 2005, when Sega revealed they had partnered with Creative Assembly to publish a console spin-off of the Total War series. It was revealed the game would be more action orientated than other games in the series, and the player would control a single warrior throughout the entire game, rather than command a legion. The following day, Sega announced they had purchased Creative Assembly as part of their strategy "to strengthen [their] emphasis on the western market." Sega also stated
 

 

 
More information about the game was released just prior to the E3 event in May. Two non-playable demo levels were shown, demonstrating the game engine's ability to create battles involving up to 170 soldiers, with advanced AI resulting in enemies and allies fighting one another irrespective of the player's actions. A new playable demo was made available at E3 itself, with Sega emphasizing that at any one time in battle, the player may have three or four simultaneous objectives. A near complete build of the game was sent out to gaming websites in August. IGN's Juan Castro wrote "while unfinished, Spartan: Total Warrior looks good and plays well ... combat feels intense and moves at a fluid pace, running at a solid framerate throughout." GameSpot's Justin Calvert was equally impressed, especially with the absence of in-game loading; "there are absolutely no load times once the action gets under way—which is no small achievement, given the sheer scale of some of the environments."

Reception

 
Spartan: Total Warrior received "mixed or average reviews" across all systems; the GameCube version holds an aggregate score of 73 out of 100 on Metacritic, based on twenty-four reviews; the PlayStation 2 version 74 out of 100, based on thirty-three reviews; and the Xbox version 73 out of 100 based on thirty-six reviews.
 
GameSpot's Greg Mueller scored the game 7.1 out of 10, calling it "a basic action game with a heavy dose of button mashing and a little bit of task management." Finding the combat repetitive, he argued, "even with the rage moves the combat can get pretty dull after a while." He was also critical of the graphics, writing "detail is sometimes sacrificed to achieve that nice frame rate. The character models are blocky, and they don't animate particularly well. Additionally, all the textures are fuzzy and bland." He concluded, "Spartan: Total Warrior is a pretty fun, though derivative, action game that should keep you entertained for at least the six or seven hours it takes you to get through the story. With just a bit more effort, Spartan could have been great."
 
IGN's Juan Castro scored the game 7.9 out of 10, arguing that "as exhilarating and action-packed as the game gets, it also gets mind-devastatingly annoying." He was particularly critical of the targeting camera when using the bow. On the other hand, he called it "a technically great game. The engine pushes hundreds of units at once while offering a good deal of visual panache. There's little to no slowdown throughout the entire experience, even with explosions rocking the screen and body parts flying every which way." He concluded "it does so many things right that it genuinely pains us to see the experience get bogged down by a handful of major annoyances. Creative Assembly crafted a marvelous game engine, too, one that affords spectacular encounters filled with more action, blood and "Holy crap did you see that!?" moments than we'd care to mention. It's therefore unfortunate that the unrefined targeting system, cheap boss battles and generally unhelpful friendly AI make the experience a mixed bag of exhilarating and exasperating moments."
 
Eurogamer's Kieron Gillen scored the PlayStation 2 version 8 out of 10, writing "initially playing it is a shock, immediately having a scope which few PS2 games – hell, few games full stop – manage to match. Opening scenes with you as a soldier among dozens in the defence of Sparta are reminiscent of Call of Dutys Russian scenes. Epic is the word." He also praised the combat and the controls, feeling the game just about avoided being a button masher. However, he found it too difficult in places, and felt that often, the time between save points was too long. However, he concluded by referring to the game as "a whole lot of slick, entertaining violence."
 
GamesRadar's Brent Goodsmith scored the game 4 out of 5. He felt it was a button masher, arguing that attacking "is executed via the trusted medium of button bashing. The developers will hate us for saying this, because they've pointed out to us on multiple occasions the non-bashy, all-skillsy nature of Spartan: Total Warriors combat." However, he didn't see this as an inherent problem; "regardless of how it is achieved, the result is much the same: oodles of rapid-fire killing and the satisfaction of hacking up enemies more numerous than in any console action game that has gone before." He concluded "Spartan does things right out of the box that the première hack-and-slash series Dynasty Warriors, about to release its tenth PS2 entry, has yet to achieve."

References

 

 
2005 video games
Activision games
Action video games
Creative Assembly games
Crowd-combat fighting games
GameCube games
Hack and slash games
PlayStation 2 games
Sega video games
Single-player video games
Total War (video game series)
Video games based on Greek mythology
Video games developed in the United Kingdom
Video games scored by Jeff van Dyck
Video games set in antiquity
Video games set in Greece
Video games set in the Roman Empire
Xbox games